Jaurès is a surname. Notable people with the surname include:

Benjamin Jaurès (1823–1889), French Admiral and Senator, uncle of Jean Jaures
Jean Jaurès (1859–1914), French socialist leader (assassinated)
Louis Jaurès (1860–1937), French admiral and deputy, brother of Jean Jaurès
Jean-Sébastien Jaurès (born 1977), French footballer

See also
Jaurès (Paris Métro) and Boulogne - Jean Jaurès (Paris Métro), metro stations named after Jean
Jaurès (song) by Jaques Brel